The 2016 Indonesian Basketball League is the eight season under the name of IBL, a nationwide basketball competition which previously known as National Basketball League (NBL).

The league will continue, despite the fact that Azrul, the owner of PT DBL Indonesia did not renew his contract. The format will be different, closer to what is done in the Philippines. Teams will play each other twice rather than three times.

Teams

Schedule

Pre-season

Preliminary round 
All times are local (UTC+7).

Group A

Group B

Group C

Finals round

Individual awards 
Finals MVP  Ponsianus Nyoman Indrawan  ( Pelita Jaya Energi Mega Persada )

Players

Foreign players 
The teams were not allowed to have foreign players but were allowed to have a naturalized player of Indonesian descent.

Rookie

Regular season

Standings

Playoffs 
Note: All times listed are in Indonesia Western Standard Time (IWST) (UTC+7).

Format 
In the quarter-finals, the two highest-seeded teams in the series has the twice-to-beat advantage; in this case, the team with the twice to beat advantage needs to be beaten twice by its opponent, while it only has to win once, in a de facto 1–0 lead in a best-of-3 series. All other series has the best-of-three format. All games were played in BritAma Arena, Jakarta from 15 to 29 May 2016.

Bracket 
Teams in bold advanced to the next round. The numbers to the left of each team indicate the team's seeding in the regular season, and the numbers to the right indicate the number of games the team won in that round.

Quarter-finals

(1) CLS Knights Surabaya vs. (8) Satya Wacana Salatiga

(2) Pelita Jaya EMP Jakarta vs. (7) Hangtuah Sumsel

(3) M88 Aspac Jakarta vs (6) Stadium Happy 8 Jakarta

(4) Satria Muda Pertamina Jakarta vs (5) Garuda Bandung

Semi-finals

(1) CLS Knights Surabaya vs. (4) Satria Muda Pertamina Jakarta

(2) Pelita Jaya EMP Jakarta vs. (3) M88 Aspac Jakarta

Finals: (1) CLS Knights Surabaya vs. (2) Pelita Jaya EMP Jakarta

Awards 
Most Valuable Player: Jamarr Andre Johnson, CLS Knights Surabaya
Rookie of the Year:  Jamarr Andre Johnson, CLS Knights Surabaya
Sixth man of the Year: Andakara Prastawa, M88 Aspac Jakarta
Defensive player of the Year: Firman Dwi Nugroho, Satya Wacana Salatiga
Most Improved Player: Firman Dwi Nugroho, Satya Wacana Salatiga
Coach of the Year: Efri Meldi, Satya Wacana Salatiga

Statistics 

Points

Assists

Rebounds

Blocks

References 

League
Indonesia